The 2021 World Junior Alpine Skiing Championships were held from 3 to 10 March 2021 in Bansko, Bulgaria.

Schedule
All times are local (UTC+2).

Medal summary

Men's events

Women's events

Medal table

References

External links
Official website

World Junior Alpine Skiing Championships
World Junior Alpine Skiing Championships
2021 in Bulgarian sport
2021 in youth sport
International sports competitions hosted by Bulgaria
March 2021 sports events in Europe